Kathryn Marie "Kathi" McDonald (September 25, 1948 – October 3, 2012) was an American blues and rock singer and songwriter. As a teenager she sang with different bands around the Pacific Northwest before she was discovered by Ike Turner. She sang as an Ikette with Ike & Tina Turner and eventually replaced Janis Joplin as the front woman of Big Brother and Holding Company. McDonald became a background vocalist for various artists, including Leon Russell, Joe Cocker, The Rolling Stones, Freddie King, and Long John Baldry. She also recorded as a solo artist and fronted her own band Kathi McDonald & Friends.

Biography 
McDonald was born in Anacortes, Washington, on September 25, 1948. McDonald began singing at an early age. The first song she fully learned was "Goodnight Irene" by Huddie Leadbetter and at age two she would sing all five verses from her crib. McDonald performed professionally for the first time around Seattle when she was 12 years old. Her musical influences were Gail Harris and Tina Turner.

From 1963 to 1968, McDonald was a vocalist in several bands that played Bellingham, Anacortes, Mount Vernon, Oak Harbor and other Pacific Northwest venues. McDonald sang with regional bands such as The Accents or Bellingham Accents (1963–1965), The Checkers (1964–1965), The Unusuals (1965–1967), and Fat Jack (1966–1968).

McDonald was 17 years old when "Babe, It's Me" peaked at number-one on the Top 50 at Bellingham's rock radio station KPUG in early April 1966. The song remained at the top of the chart for four to five weeks. The single, released on the Panorama label, was the first release by The Unusuals (formerly The Bellingham Accents) and it featured vocals by McDonald and Laurie Vitt who wrote the song and was a founding member of the band. Shortly thereafter, with McDonald as soloist, the Unusuals released their second single "Summer is Over" and, while it received airplay on local radio, it was a lesser hit in the Pacific Northwest. Kathi & The Unusuals toured with Dewey Martin (pseudonym Sir Raleigh and previously Sir Raleigh and the Cupons).

While living in Seattle, McDonald developed strong San Francisco music connections and promoter Chet Helms invited her to audition for Big Brother and the Holding Company in 1966. He also invited a then-unknown Janis Joplin from Austin, Texas. Joplin arrived in San Francisco before McDonald and was hired to front the band. McDonald held some resentment for losing the job to Joplin, who people often compared her voice to, she stated: "I used to hate doing Janis songs...It really was annoying for a lot of years, but I finally made my peace with it. I read some books about her and I realized what a pathetic life she had, with all kinds of screwups. It was terrible. The poor thing. Anything that could have gone wrong, did go wrong. I thought it was just one big freakin' party, but it wasn't. She had a lot of heartbreak."

McDonald relocated to San Francisco at the age of 19. At an Ike & Tina Turner concert at promoter Bill Graham's Carousel Ballroom (Fillmore West) in San Francisco, McDonald caught the attention of bandleader Ike Turner when she was singing along to "River Deep, Mountain High". She was pregnant at the time and he invited her to record as an Ikette in the studio. As an Ikette, she sang on their album Come Together (1970). She then recorded with Big Brother and the Holding Company after Joplin split with the band.

Around this time, McDonald became one of Leon Russell's Shelter People
. She sang on Russell's album Leon Russell And The Shelter People (1971). McDonald also contributed backing vocals to four tracks that appear on The Rolling Stones album Exile on Main Street (1972), including the hit single "Tumbling Dice". During this period, she sang with various artists, including Freddie King, Joe Cocker, Rita Coolidge, and Delaney & Bonnie.

In 1973, she recorded her debut solo album, Insane Asylum, for Capitol Records. The album was co-produced by David Briggs and Pete Sears. Sears was also her musical arranger and played keyboards and bass, as well as writing several of the album's songs with McDonald. The album featured musicians such as Nils Lofgren, John Cipollina and Neal Schon on guitar, Aynsley Dunbar on drums, Boots Hughston on horns. McDonald sang a cover of Willie Dixon's "Insane Asylum" with Sly Stone. The album was released in 1974 and reached #156 on the Billboard 200. Rufus was McDonald's opening act when she performed at The Whisky in May 1974.

In 1976, McDonald met blues singer Long John Baldry and they collaborated until his death in 2005.  She toured with him and they enjoyed success in Australia where their duet "You've Lost That Lovin' Feelin'" reached #2 in 1980.

Twenty years after her debut, she released her sophomore album, Save Your Breath, in 1994. McDonald reunited with Big Brother and the Holding Company in California for a concert on New Year's Eve, 1997. Her next album, Above and Beyond, was released in 1999. It featured Lee Oskar on harmonica and Brian Auger on keyboards.

In later years, McDonald contributed to the Seattle Women in Rhythm and Blues project.

McDonald eventually fronted her own band and continued to perform regionally. In February 2009, she performed at the opening gala for the San Francisco Museum of Performance & Design along with Sam Andrew, welcoming in a new exhibition dedicated to the art and music of San Francisco of the 1965-1975 era.

McDonald struggled with alcoholism and drug abuse. She died at the age of 64 in Seattle, Washington, on October 3, 2012. She was survived by a daughter and four grandchildren.

Accolades 
McDonald was inducted into the Washington Blues Society's Hall of Fame in 1999.

Discography

Albums 

 1974: Insane Asylum (Capitol Records)  – reached #156 on the Billboard 200
 1994: Save Your Breath (Hypertension Music)
 1999: Above & Beyond (Merrimack Records)
2004: Kathi McDonald
2010: Kathi McDonald & Friends – On With The Show
 2011: Kathi McDonald & Rich Kirch – Nothin' But Trouble (TearDrop Records)
2016: On With The Show (Marin Records)

Singles 

1966: The Unusuals – "Babe, It's Me"
1966: The Unusuals – "Summer Is Over"
1974: Kathi McDonald – "Freak Lover" / "Bogart To Bowie" (Capitol 3835)
 1974: Kathi McDonald – "Bogart To Bowie" / "(Love Is Like A) Heat Wave" (Capitol 3880)
 1974: Kathi McDonald – "Somethin' Else" / "Threw My Love Away" (Capitol 2C 008–81670)
 1979: Long John Baldry & Kathi McDonald – "You've Lost That Lovin' Feelin'" (EMI America 8018) - AUS #2
 1986: Long John Baldry with Kathi McDonald – "Ain't That Peculiar" (Music Line MLS 004)

Backing vocal credits 

 1970: Ike & Tina Turner and The Ikettes – Come Together (uncredited)
1970: Big Brother And The Holding Company – Be a Brother
 1971: Freddie King – Getting Ready
 1971: Leon Russell – Leon Russell And The Shelter People
 1971: Nigel Olsson – Nigel Olsson's Drum Orchestra And Chorus
 1971: Don Nix – Living By The Days
 1971: Big Brother And The Holding Company – How Hard It Is
 1971: Delaney & Bonnie – To Bonnie from Delaney (uncredited)
 1971: Rita Coolidge – Rita Coolidge (uncredited)
 1972: Tony Kelly – Bring Me Back
 1972: Terry Dolan – Terry Dolan
 1972: The Rolling Stones – Exile On Main St.
 1972: Grin – All Out
 1973: Betty Davis – Betty Davis
 1974: "Rock 'N' Roll Preacher" and "Galilee" on Chuck Girard by Chuck Girard
 1976: "Stranger In A Strange Land" on Best Of Leon by Leon Russell
 1976: "Razooli" on Diga by Diga Rhythm Band 
 1978: Quicksilver Messenger Service – Solid Silver
 1979: Nils Lofgren & Grin – Nils Lofgren & Grin
 1979: Long John Baldry – Baldry's Out!
 1983: "Ready To Make Up" and "Don't Give Me The Once Over" on Girls Night Out  by Toronto 
 1986: Quicksilver – Peace By Piece
 1987: Long John Baldry – Long John Baldry & Friends
 1988: Long John Baldry – A Touch Of The Blues
1991: Long John Baldry – It Still Ain't Easy
 1995: Novato Frank Band – Rock 'N' Roll Heaven
 1995: John Lee Sanders – World Blue
 1996: Long John Baldry – Right To Sing The Blues
1997: Big Brother And The Holding Company – Can't Go Home Again
 2001: Long John Baldry – Remembering Leadbelly
2009: Long John Baldry – Live – Iowa State University

References

External links
Official website
Kathi Mcdonald on AllMusic

Catalog of Kathi McDonald's earliest work with The Unusuals

The three recordings, featuring Kathi's singing, are from 1965 to 1966. At that time, she was the female vocalist for The Unusuals, a regionally popular Pacific Northwest band. Personal recordings and photos at this site were provided by, and the channel was approved by, Laurie Vitt, songwriter, band member affiliated with Kathi McDonald in her formative years, and a founding member of The Unusuals. Included in this collection is the #1 regional hit "Babe, It's Me" (vocals by McDonald and Vitt) and "Summer is Over" (Kathi lead vocalist). 

1948 births
2012 deaths
People from Anacortes, Washington
American blues singers
American rock singers
Big Brother and the Holding Company members
Musicians from Seattle
Singer-songwriters from Washington (state)
Ike & Tina Turner members
Capitol Records artists
Singers from San Francisco
American women singer-songwriters
Singer-songwriters from California